The president of Tunisia is the head of state of Tunisia, directly elected to a five-year term by the people. The officeholder leads the executive branch of the Tunisian government along with the prime minister and is the commander-in-chief of the Tunisian Armed Forces.

Since the office was established in 1957, Five men have served as president. The seventh and current president is Kais Saied since 23 October 2019. There are currently three living former presidents. The most recent former president to die was Zine El Abidine Ben Ali, on 19 September 2019.

The presidency of Mohamed Ennaceur, who assumed the office as acting president following the death of incumbent president Beji Caid Essebsi, was the shortest in Tunisian history (90 days). Habib Bourguiba, the inaugural holder, served the longest, over thirty years (1957–1987), before he was removed from office by his prime minister Ben Ali, on 7 November 1987. Since the ratification of the Tunisian Constitution in 2014, no person may be elected president more than twice.

Of those who have served as the nation's president, only one died in office of natural causes (Beji Caid Essebsi), two were removed from office (Habib Bourguiba and Zine El Abidine Ben Ali) and two assumed the office as acting presidents (Fouad Mebazaa and Mohamed Ennaceur).

Background
Tunisia has had seven presidents since the proclamation of the republic on 25 July 1957:
 Habib Bourguiba was appointed president by the parliament on 25 July 1957, until the election of a permanent president. After the Constitution was enacted on 1 June 1959, a presidential election was held on 8 November 1959. Being the only one running for office, he gained 91% of the votes to serve a five-year term. He was elected unopposed three more times. Shortly after winning his fourth full term, he was proclaimed president for life. He remained in office until being deposed in the coup d'état of 7 November 1987, organized by his prime minister, Ben Ali.
 Zine El Abidine Ben Ali was prime minister and interior minister under Bourguiba. Ben Ali had Bourguiba declared medically unfit to serve 7 November 1987. Per the constitution, he became acting president pending new elections. Ben Ali was elected unopposed for a full five-year term on 2 April 1989, and was reelected three more times (the first time unopposed). On 14 January 2011, his regime fell in the Tunisian Revolution that started on 17 December 2010. Mohamed Ghannouchi, his prime minister, claimed the presidency, serving as acting president.
 Fouad Mebazaa was designated by the Constitutional Council to serve as acting president on 15 January 2011. Under Article 57 of the constitution, an election should have taken place between 45 and 60 days following Mebazaa's appointment. But on 3 March 2011, he announced the repeal of the 1959 constitution and the election of a constituent assembly which had to draft a new one. Therefore, he remained acting president pending new elections.
 Moncef Marzouki was elected president by the Tunisian Constituent Assembly on 12 December 2011. The next day, he was inaugurated, making him the first president not to be member of the ruling party. During the 2014 presidential election, he was defeated by former prime minister Caid Essebsi and left office on 31 December 2014.
 Beji Caid Essebsi became the first president to be elected by universal suffrage after the revolution, on 21 December 2014. On 31 December 2014, he took office as the fifth president of Tunisia, and the first to be freely elected. He died on 25 July 2019, and was succeeded by Mohamed Ennaceur as acting president.
 Mohamed Ennaceur became acting president in accordance with Articles 84 and 85 of the constitution on 25 July 2019, following the death in office of President Essebsi. Per the constitution, Ennaceur was to serve as acting president for no more than 90 days, during which an early presidential election was to be held. An election had already been scheduled for November 2019, but was brought forward to September to ensure that a new president would be sworn in before the 90-day limit.
 Kais Saied was elected in September 2019. He took office on 23 October as the second president (Marzouki being the first) who was not an heir to Bourguiba's legacy.

Presidents

Rank by time in office

Timeline

See also
 Politics of Tunisia
 List of beys of Tunis
 List of French residents-general in Tunisia
 President of Tunisia
 First Lady of Tunisia
 Prime Minister of Tunisia
 List of prime ministers of Tunisia

References

External links
World Statesmen - Tunisia

 
Tunisia, List of Presidents of
Presidents